The 2001 Copa del Rey Juvenil was the 51st staging of the Copa del Rey Juvenil de Fútbol tournament. The competition began on May 13, 2001 and ended on June 24, 2001 with the final.

First round

|}

Quarterfinals

|}

Semifinals

|}

Final

Copa del Rey Juvenil de Fútbol
Juvenil